Sepana Victor Letsoalo (born 1 April 1993) is a South African soccer player who plays as a forward for South African Premier Division side Sekhukhune United and South African national team.

Club career
He signed for Bloemfontein Celtic from Baroka in 2017.

International career
He made his debut for South Africa national soccer team on 13 July 2021 in a 2021 COSAFA Cup game against Lesotho and scored a hat-trick in a 4–0 victory, becoming the first South African player to score three times on his national team debut. He scored one more goal in the semi-final against Mozambique as South Africa won the tournament and he became the top goal scorer with 4 goals.

International goals
 South Africa score listed first, score column indicates score after each Letsoalo goal.

honours
Baroka F.C.
National First Division: 2015-16

References

External links

1993 births
Living people
South African soccer players
South Africa international soccer players
Association football forwards
Baroka F.C. players
Bloemfontein Celtic F.C. players
Royal AM F.C. players
Sekhukhune United F.C. players
National First Division players
South African Premier Division players